Combat pour le socialisme (French for 'Struggle for Socialism') is the organ of the Working Committees of the Socialist Party in Senegal. It has been published monthly since 1986.

References

1986 establishments in Senegal
French-language magazines
Magazines established in 1986
Monthly magazines
Magazines published in Senegal
Socialist magazines